Kala azar is a 2020 Greek film written and directed by Janis Rafailidou.

The plot focuses on a young couple (Pinelope Tsilika and Dimitris Lalos) who collect and cremate dead pets and return the ashes to their owners.

Cast
Pinelope Tsilika as Penelope
Dimitris Lalos as Dimitris
Michele Valley as Mother
Tasos Rafailidis as Father

Accolades

References

External links 
 

2020 drama films
Greek drama films
2020s Greek-language films